Philosophical Fragments is a Christian philosophical work written by Danish philosopher Søren Kierkegaard in 1844. It was the second of three works written under the pseudonym Johannes Climacus; the other two were De omnibus dubitandum est in 1841 and Concluding Unscientific Postscript to Philosophical Fragments in 1846.

Overview
Kierkegaardian scholars D. Anthony Storm and Walter Lowrie believe Kierkegaard could be referring to Johannes Climacus, a 7th-century Christian monk, who believed that an individual is converted to Christianity by way of a ladder, one rung (virtue) at a time. Kierkegaard believes the individual comes to an understanding with Christ by a leap.

Kierkegaard scholar and translator David F. Swenson was the first to translate the book into English in 1936. He called it "Philosophical Chips" in an earlier biography of Kierkegaard published in 1921and another early translator, Lee Milton Hollander, called it "Philosophic Trifles" in his early translation of portions of Kierkegaard's works in 1923.

Kierkegaard hinted that he might write a "sequel in 17 pieces" in his preface.  By February 22, 1846 he published a 600-page sequel to his 83-page Fragments. He devoted over 200 pages of Concluding Unscientific Postscript to an explanation of what he meant by Philosophical Fragments.

He referred to a quote by Plato in his Postscript to Philosophical Fragments:  "But I must ask you Socrates, what do you suppose is the upshot of all this? As I said a little while ago, it is the scrapings and shavings of argument, cut up into little bits." – Greater Hippias, 304a. He could have been thinking about this quote when he wrote this book. Plato was asking "What is beauty?" Kierkegaard asks, "What is Truth?" Kierkegaard had already asked about truth 9 days earlier when he published Three Upbuilding Discourses. A mere 4 days from the publication of Philosophical Fragments he published The Concept of Anxiety.

Kierkegaard wrote his books in reaction to both Georg Wilhelm Friedrich Hegel and Karl Wilhelm Friedrich Schlegel as well as the philosophic-historical use of speculation in regard to Christianity. Schlegel published a book bearing the same title as Kierkegaard's, Philosophical Fragments in 1799.

Structure
Kierkegaard always wrote a preface signed by the name of the pseudonymous author he was using. He began this practice with his unpublished book Johannes Climacus and continued it throughout his writing career. However, he added his own name as the person responsible for publication of Philosophical Fragments, Concluding Unscientific Postscript, The Sickness Unto Death and Practice in Christianity. He also wrote many discourses which he signed with his own name. He began that practice with the writing of Two Upbuilding Discourses in 1843. 
He divides his book into five major sections 
A Project of Thought
The God as Teacher and Savior: An Essay of the Imagination
The Absolute Paradox of the Offended Christian
Appendix: The Paradox and the Offended Consciousness
The Case of the Contemporary Disciple
Interlude
The Disciple at Second Hand

Later, in his Concluding Unscientific Postscript Kierkegaard said "The Issue in Fragments is an Introductory Issue, Not to Christianity but to Becoming a Christian."

Overview
Kierkegaard uses familiar Christian vocabulary to develop his own method for arriving at Truth. He presents two views, the Socratic and the religious. Socrates is considered an authoritative voice in the philosophic community so Kierkegaard begins with his ideas. He developed the doctrine of recollection which Kierkegaard makes use of in his explanation of Truth and ignorance.

His aim is to advance beyond Socrates, who was interested in finite truth, to another Teacher who explained Eternal Truth. The Enlightenment movement was intent on combining concepts of God, nature, knowledge and man into one world view. Kierkegaard was a counter-Enlightenment writer. He believed that knowledge of God was a "condition" that only "the God" can give and the "Moment" God gives the condition to the Learner has "decisive significance".

He uses the category of the single individual to help those seeking to become Christians. He says, "I am he who himself has been educated to the point of becoming a Christian. In the fact that education is pressed upon me, and in the measure that it is pressed, I press in turn upon this age; but I am not a teacher, only a fellow student." And again, "Once and for all I must earnestly beg the kind reader always to bear in mente (in mind) that the thought behind the whole work is: what it means to become a Christian." He can only bring an individual to the point of becoming a Christian because the single individual must choose to become a Christian in freedom. Kierkegaard says, either believe or be offended. But choose.

Philosophers and Historians tend to try to prove Christianity rather than teach belief in Christ through faith. Kierkegaard says,

A Project of Thought
Kierkegaard uses the Doctrine of Recollection as an example of how truth was found in Ancient Greek philosophy and is still found in psychotherapy and modern medicine. Both of these sciences are based on questioning the patient, "Learner", in the  hope of jogging their memory about past events. The therapist could ask the right question and not realize he has received the answer he was looking for, this is known as Meno's paradox. Kierkegaard puts his paradox this way, "what a man knows he cannot seek, since he knows it; and what he does not know he cannot seek, since he does not even know for what to seek."

The problem for the "Learner" is that he is in "Error",  and is ignorant of his Error. He had the truth from birth, he knew who his creator was, but forgot. Kierkegaard calls this Error "Sin". How can he find out that he had vested his life in outer  goods rather than the inner goods of the Spirit? A Teacher must bring him the "condition" necessary for understanding the Truth. He explains the whole process this way: <blockquote><blockquote>

Now he owes everything to his Teacher but is saddened that it took so long to find out that he forgot his soul belonged to God and not to the world, and he "Repents". The "Moment" the Teacher brings the condition the learner experiences a "New Birth". Kierkegaard says a "change has taken place within him like the change from non-being to being. He calls this change "Conversion". He says, "When one who has experienced birth thinks of himself as born, he conceives this transition from non-being to being. The same principle must also hold in the case of the new birth. Or is the difficulty increased by the fact that the non-being which precedes the new birth contains more being than the non-being which preceded the first birth? But who then may be expected to think the new birth?" This is a paradox.

When the seed of the oak is planted in earthen vessels, they break asunder; when new wine is poured in old leather bottles, they burst; what must happen when the God implants himself in human weakness, unless man becomes a new vessel and a new creature! But this becoming, what labors will attend the change, how convulsed with birth-pangs! And the understanding—how precarious, and how close each moment to misunderstanding, when the anguish of guilt seeks to disturb the peace of love! And how rapt in fear; for it is indeed less terrible to fall to the ground when the mountains tremble at the voice of the God, than to sit at table with him as an equal; and yet it is the God's concern precisely to have it so. Philosophical Fragments p. 27

How many an individual has not asked, “What is truth?” and at bottom hoped that it would be a long time before the truth would come so close to him that in the same instant it would determine what it was his duty to do at that moment. When the Pharisee, “in order to justify himself,” asked, “Who is my neighbor?” he presumably thought that this might develop into a very protracted inquiry, so that it would perhaps take a very long time and then perhaps end with the admission that it was impossible to define the concept “neighbor” with absolute accuracy – for this very reason he asked the question, to find an escape, to waste time, and to justify himself. But God catches the wise in their foolishness, and Christ imprisoned the questioner in the answer that contained the task. So it is with all Christ’s answers. Søren Kierkegaard, Works of Love p. 96-97The truth is within me, that is, when I am truly within myself (not untruthfully outside myself), the truth, if it is there, is a being, a life. Therefore it says, "This is eternal life, to know the only true God and the one whom he sent, the truth." (John 14:6 The Bible) That is, only then do I in truth know the truth, when it becomes a life in me. Therefore Christ compares truth to food and appropriating it to eating, just as, physically, food by being appropriated (assimilated) becomes the life sustenance, so also, spiritually, truth is both the giver of life and the sustenance of life, is life. Practice in Christianity, Hong 1991 p. 206 But Kierkegaard went deeply into the choice in his first book, Either/Or:

The God as Teacher, Saviour and the Paradox
Kierkegaard leads his reader to consider how a teacher might become a teacher. He says life and its circumstances constitute an occasion for an individual to become a teacher and he in turn becomes an occasion for the learner to learn something. Socrates was such a teacher as this. But what about God? What would be the occasion that moved him to become a Teacher? God is moved by love but his love is unhappy. He wants to make himself understood just like a teacher but He's teaching something that doesn't come to an individual from the known world but from a world that is Unknown. "His love is a love of the learner, and his aim is to win him. For it is only in love that the unequal can be made equal, and it is only in equality or unity that an understanding can be effected, and without a perfect understanding the Teacher is not the God, unless the obstacle comes wholly from the side of the learner, in his refusing to realize that which had been made possible for him."

God's goal is to make himself understood and, according to Kierkegaard, he has three options. He could elevate the learner to help the learner forget the misunderstanding. God could show himself to the learner and cause him to forget his Error while contemplating God's presence. Both options are rejected on the basis of equality. How can God make himself equal to man? Only by becoming man himself, but not a king, or a leader of an established order, no, for equality's sake he must become one of the humblest, a servant.

But God can't make himself understood because he's completely unlike every other human being. God has not sinned, whereas every human being has. This is a paradox but the ultimate paradox is that a single individual who looks just like everyone else is God. "The thesis that God has existed in human form, was born, grew up; is certainly the paradox in the strictest sense, the absolute paradox." Christianity is also a paradox as well as the forgiveness of sins. Kierkegaard is saying that the "Moment" the individual comes in contact with the Paradox is of utmost importance because this is where the decision is made. This is his Either/Or. Either believe or be offended. Reason is attempting to understand the Paradox but comes to its own limit and can't understand what it knows nothing about. 

Kierkegaard says Reason "collides" with the knowledge of the Unknown. If Reason and God have a happy encounter the individual comes to be a believer. If the collision results in an unhappy encounter the Reason is Offended. The Reason says that the Paradox is absurd and can get no meaning from the encounter. But when "Reason yielded itself while the Paradox bestowed itself, and the understanding is consummated in that happy passion, the individual is happy and asks for nothing more." Kierkegaard says Christ offers every single individual the "invitation."

The Disciple and the Disciple at Second Hand
Kierkegaard explores how a contemporary of Christ and succeeding generations receive the "condition" necessary to understand  the Paradox that God has permitted himself to be born and wrapped in swaddling-clothes. A contemporary could have been living abroad and in that case the contemporary would have to hear the story from eyewitnesses. How reliable would they be? The only thing they saw was a lowly servant. The immediate contemporary can "serve as an occasion for the acquirement of historical knowledge", an occasion to help the individual understand himself in the Socratic sense, or the contemporary could have received the condition from God and become a believer.

The "condition" comes into existence. Kierkegaard says the "coming-into-existence is a kind of change, but is not a change in essence but in being and is a transition from not existing to existing. But this non-being which the subject of coming into existence leaves behind must itself have some sort of being. He asks his reader to consider whether the necessary can come into existence or if the necessary "Is", since everything that comes into existence is historical. But for Kierkegaard "all coming into existence takes place in freedom." The disciple freely chooses to follow Christ when the Holy Spirit convinces him that he's a sinner.

He finally discloses what this "condition" the "Moment" brings to the individual. He says, "faith has precisely the required character; for in the certainty of belief there is always present a negated uncertainty, in every way corresponding to the uncertainty of coming into existence. Faith believes what it does not see..." 

An individual can know what Christianity is without being a Christian. Kierkegaard says, "By Baptism Christianity gives him a name, and he is a Christian de nomine (by name); but in the decision he becomes a Christian and gives Christianity his name. It would indeed be a ludicrous contradiction if an existing person asked what Christianity is in terms of existence and then spent his whole life deliberating on that-for in that case when should he exist in it?" 

Belief is not a form of knowledge, but a free act, an expression of will, it is not having a relationship with a doctrine but having a relationship with God. Kierkegaard says "Faith, self-active, relates itself to the improbable and the paradox, is self-active in discovering it and in holding it fast at every moment-in order to be able to believe."

Kierkegaard mentioned Johann Georg Hamann (1730-1788) in his book Repetition p. 149 (1843) and this book, Philosophical Fragments (p. 38ff, Swenson), and what Kierkegaard writes is written also by Hamann in his book, Socratic Memorabilia, in this way:

Reviews and assessments
Kierkegaard was criticized by his former teacher and pastor Hans Lassen Martensen, he concludes from Kierkegaard's writing, here and in Concluding Unscientific Postscript, that he's saying an individual can be saved without the help of the Church. Martensen believed 19th century Socialism would destroy individuality, but regarded Kierkegaard's emphasis on the single individual as too one-sided. Kierkegaard was responding to Hegelian writers such as Ludwig Feuerbach and David Strauss who emphasized the objective nature of God. God is just man's idea.  Otto Pfleiderer wrote an assessment of Kierkegaard's views in 1877. He called his work "ascetic individualistic mysticism."

Robert L Perkins wrote a book about Kierkegaard's books which used Johannes Climacus as a pseudonym. and Kierkegaardian biographer, Alastair Hannay, discusses  Philosophical Fragments 36 times in Søren Kierkegaard, A Biography. Jyrki Kivelä wonders if Kierkegaard's Paradox is David Hume's miracle. Which comes first existence or essence? Richard Gravil tries to explain it in his book Existentialism. Kierkegaard says God comes into existence again and again for each single individual. He didn't just come once for all.

Existential point of view
An early existentialist, Miguel de Unamuno, discussed the relation between faith and reason in relation to Kierkegaard's "Postscript" to this book.

Hegel and his followers accepted Christianity without miracles or any other supernaturalism. Robert Solomon puts it this way: "What is Christianity, "revealed religion," divested of its "figurative thought"? It is a faith without icons, images, stories, and myths, without miracles, without a resurrection, without a nativity, without Chartres and Fra Angelico, without wine and wafers, without heaven and hell, without God as judge and without judgment. With philosophical conceptualization, the Trinity is reduced to Kant's categories of Universality (God the father) Particularity (Christ the Son) and Individuality (The Holy Spirit). The incarnation no longer refers to Christ alone, but only to the philosophical thesis that there is no God other than humanity. Spirit, that is, humanity made absolute, is God, which is to say that there is nothing other than humanity … What is left after the philosophical conceptualization of religion? To the orthodox Christian, nothing is left, save some terminology which has been emptied of its traditional significance. From Hegel's gutted Christianity to Heine and Nietzsche's aesthetic atheism is a very short distance indeed. From Hegel to Existentialism, By Robert C. Solomon, Oxford University Press US, 1989 p. 61

Eduard Geismar gave a seminar about the religious thought of Kierkegaard in 1933. He said, "Kierkegaard develops the concept of an existential thinker. The task of such a thinker is to understand himself in his existence, with its uncertainty, its risk and its passion. Socrates was such an existential thinker. … from Socrates he has learned his method of communication, the indirect method. From Socrates he has learned to abstain from giving the reader and objective result to memorize, a systematic scheme for arrangement in paragraphs, all of which is relevant only to objective science, but irrelevant to existential thought. From Socrates he has learned to confront the reader with a question, to picture the ideal as a possibility. From Socrates he has learned to keep the reader at a distance, to throw him back on his individual responsibility, to compel him to find his own way to a solution. Kierkegaard does not merely talk about self-reliance; his entire literary art is devoted to the promotion of self-reliance."

Jean-Paul Sartre vehemently disagreed with Kierkegaard's subjective ideas. He was Hegelian and had no room in his system for faith. Kierkegaard seemed to rely on faith at the expense of the intellect. He developed the idea of bad faith. His idea is relative to Kierkegaard's idea of the Moment. If a situation (occasion for Kierkegaard) makes an individual aware of his authentic self and the individual fails to choose that self that constitutes bad faith.

Sartre was against Kierkegaard's view that God can only be approached subjectively. 

Time Magazine summed up Sartre and Camus' interpretation of Kierkegaard in this way,

Christian point of view
Johann Goethe was influenced by Jean Jacques Rousseau's book, Emile, or On Education and Kierkegaard may have been also. Here is a quotation from his book: 

Soren Kierkegaard read the works of both Hegel and Goethe. His ideas expressed in this book could have come from a few maxims written by Johann Goethe. Goethe and Kierkegaard each stressed the need for the individual to come to an understanding of what the Bible is all about and then applying that understanding as it is appropriated.

Paul Tillich and Neo-orthodox theologians were influenced by Søren Kierkegaard. Tillich's book The New Being is similar to Kierkegaard's idea of the "New Birth". He's more of a Christian existentialist than an Existentialist. Many of the 20th century Theologians attempt to answer all the questions of Christianity for the individual, like who Jesus was as a person. Kierkegaard's idea was different. He believed each single individual comes to Christ in his or her unique way. He was against all speculation regarding whether or not an individual accepts the prompting of the Holy Spirit. A New Birth doesn't come about through historical or philosophical ponderings. He wrote,"There is a prayer which especially in our times would be so apt: 'God in heaven, I thank you for not requiring a person to comprehend Christianity, for if it were required, then I would be of all men the most miserable. The more I seek to comprehend it, the more I discover merely the possibility of offence. Therefore, I thank you for requiring only faith and I pray you will continue to increase it." "When love forgives the miracle of faith happens"

Emil Brunner mentioned Kierkegaard in his 1934 book Mediator. "This is the stumbling-block in Christianity: that revelation, the divine manifestation-that is, eternal truth and everlasting salvation-has to be connected with the fact which took place once for all, or,-it amounts to the same thing-that we can never approach God directly but only through the Mediator. This stumbling-block is not only through the intellect-as Kierkegaard’s teaching would suggest. It is true, of course, that to the Greeks the message of the Cross was foolishness. Pride of intellect revolts against the claim that truth lies outside the realm of reason."

Thomas Merton, a Trappist Monk was influenced by Philosophical Fragments and other works by Kierkegaard. He wrote a book about the new birth in 1961. Merton says we come to an understanding with God because he gives us free speech, Parrhesia. Kierkegaard and Merton both point more to understanding than to reason as the motivating factor in belief.

University of Pennsylvania Professor Louis H. Mackey described Johann Climacus' point of view in his 1971 book Kierkegaard: A Kind  of Poet (p. 164): "Climacus’ point in the Philosophical Fragments is that Christianity, which came into the world as a Miracle, ever remains a mystery beyond comprehension and imagination, intelligible only to a faith that is itself miraculous and God-given. But this does not mean that the act of faith entails spiritual suicide; it is rather the refusal to believe that stultifies. In any encounter of man with God-and that is what Christianity proposes-the initiative is God’s. Man’s only possible responses are faith or offense."

Julie Watkin, from the University of Tasmania, Australia, wrote the following about this book: Philosophical Fragments (…) "investigates in somewhat abstract philosophical language the Platonic-Socratic idea of recollection of truth before considering how truth is brought about in Christianity. The distinction made here is that with the former, the individual possesses the truth and so the teacher merely has to provoke it maieutically to the surface, so to speak, and is not vitally important, since any teacher would do. Where Christianity is concerned, the individual is like a blind person, needing the restoration of sight before he or she can see. The individual had the condition for seeing initially but is to blame for the loss of sight. The individual in Christianity thus needs the God and Savior to provide the condition for learning the truth that the individual is in untruth (i.e., sin). Since the God appears in the form of a lowly human and is not immediately recognizable, there is the element of the paradox. The individual must set aside objections of the understanding so that the paradoxical savior (who is the vitally important object of faith rather than the teaching) can give him-or herself to the individual in the moment along with the condition of faith."

Was Kierkegaard a Monergist or a Synergist?  God's love moves everything.Moved by love, the God is thus eternally resolved to reveal himself. But as love is the motive so love must also be the end; for it would be a contradiction for the God to have a motive and an end which did not correspond. His love is a love of the learner, and his aim is to win him. For it is only in love that the unequal can be made equal, and it is only in equality or unity that an understanding can be effected, and without a perfect understanding the Teacher is not the God, unless the obstacle comes wholly from the side of the learner, in his refusing to realize that which had been made possible for him. But this love is through and through unhappy, for how great is the difference between them! It may seem a small matter for the God to make himself understood, but this is not so easy of accomplishment if he is to refrain from annihilating the unlikeness that exists between them. Philosophical Fragments p. 20

See also
The New life of Dante Alighieri (The Vita Nuova of Dante) 
Johann Gottlieb FichteThe Doctrine of Religion Lecture III:  Difficulties Arising from the Common Mode of Thought: Definition of Being (Seyn) and Ex-istence (Deseyn) p. 419ff 1806
Selected sermons of Schleiermacher, Chapter IV: The Necessity of the New Birth
Faith and Knowledge, by Georg Wilhelm Friedrich Hegel, 1802-Google Books
 Thomas Carlyle, Sartor Resartus, The Everlasting Yea or No
 19th Cent. Philosophy: Soren Kierkegaard Gregory B. Sadler, has a whole video series about Philosophical Fragments on YouTube.

Notes

References

Sources

Primary sources
 Online English text of the Fragments
 Philosophical fragments Google Books (it has the historical introduction to the book)
 Concluding Unscientific Postscript to Philosophical Fragments Volume I, by Johannes Climacus, edited by Søren Kierkegaard, Copyright 1846 – Edited and Translated by Howard V. Hong and Edna H. Hong 1992 Princeton University Press

Secondary sources
 The Philosophy of Religion: On the Basis of Its History, by Otto Pfleiderer 1887 p. 209-213, 307-308
 Philosophical fragments and Johannes Climacus by Robert L. Perkins, Mercer University Press, 1994
 Kierkegaard: a biography by Alastair Hannay, Cambridge University Press, 2003 p. 222ff
 Is Kierkegaard's Absolute Paradox Hume's Miracle? By Jyrki Kivelä
 Existentialism from Dostoyevsky to Sartre; The Search for Method (1st part). Introduction to Critique of Dialectical Reason, I. Marxism & Existentialism, Jean-Paul Sartre 1960
 Existentialism by Richard Gravil, Humanities-Ebooks
 Run to the mountain: the story of a vocation by Thomas Merton, Patrick Hart, HarperCollins, 1995

External links
 

1844 books
Books by Søren Kierkegaard
Epistemology literature
Philosophy of religion literature
Works published under a pseudonym